The Mississippian Pocono Formation is a mapped bedrock unit in Pennsylvania, Maryland, and West Virginia, in the United States. It is also known as the Pocono Group in Maryland and West Virginia,
and the upper part of the Pocono Formation is sometimes called the Burgoon Formation or Burgoon Sandstone in Pennsylvania.
The Pocono is a major ridge-former In the Ridge-and-Valley Appalachians of the eastern United States

The Pocono is also a lateral equivalent of the Purslane Sandstone in Maryland and West Virginia.  D. Brezinski of Maryland Geological Survey recommended abandoning use of the term Pocono in Maryland in favor of "Purslane" in 1989.

Description
The Pocono is a dominantly gray color with quartzitic medium to coarse-grained sandstones. The base of the Pocono Formation is marked by conglomerate.

Notable exposures
 The type section of the Burgoon Sandstone is in the valley of Burgoon Run, above Kittanning Point, Blair County, Pennsylvania.
 A spectacular exposure of the Purslane Sandstone (equivalent to the Pocono) is at the I-68 road cut through Sideling Hill in Maryland.

Age
Relative age dating of the Pocono places it in the lower Mississippian period. The lower boundary is with the Spetchy Kopf Formation and Huntley Mountain Formation. In South-central Pennsylvania, the Pocono often interfingers with the Rockwell Formation.

References

See also 
 Geology of Pennsylvania
 Canaan Valley

Geologic formations of Pennsylvania
Geologic formations of West Virginia
Geologic formations of Maryland
Carboniferous System of North America
Conglomerate formations
Sandstone formations of the United States
Mississippian United States
Carboniferous geology of Pennsylvania
Carboniferous West Virginia
Carboniferous Maryland
Devonian geology of Pennsylvania
Devonian Maryland
Devonian West Virginia
Cliff-formers
Devonian southern paleotemperate deposits
Carboniferous southern paleotemperate deposits
Carboniferous southern paleotropical deposits